Manuel Tolentino (born March 27, 1966) is a former tennis player from the Philippines.

Career
Tolentino represented his native country at the 1984 Summer Olympics in Los Angeles, where he was defeated in the first round by the United States' Eric Amend.

Tolentino for a time was the top player in the ITF junior rankings.The right-hander reached his highest singles ATP-ranking on August 31, 1987, when he became world No. 437. Tolentino participated in Davis Cup ties for the Philippines from 1984 to 1987, posting a 4–5 record in singles.

In 1982, Tolentino clinched the men's single title at the Philippine Columbian Association Open at age 16 over 28-year old Ody Gabriel. This made Tolentino the winner who had the widest age gap with their final opponent of 12 years. This record would be broken by 18-year old Bryan Otico who won a PCA Open title against an opponent 14 years older than himself. Tolentino was also became the youngest PCA Open champion, a record broken by Alberto Lim Jr. in 2015 by two months.

Post-retirement
As of 2020, Tolentino is based in the San Francisco Bay Area in the United States.

References

External links
 
 
 
 

1966 births
Living people
Filipino male tennis players
People from the San Francisco Bay Area
Tennis players at the 1984 Summer Olympics
Olympic tennis players of the Philippines
Southeast Asian Games medalists in tennis
Southeast Asian Games silver medalists for the Philippines
Southeast Asian Games bronze medalists for the Philippines
Competitors at the 1983 Southeast Asian Games
Competitors at the 1985 Southeast Asian Games
Competitors at the 1987 Southeast Asian Games